For motorsport, the following is the List of AIACR European Championship winners.

By driver

By nationality

Most wins per season

See also
AIACR European Championship
Grand Prix motor racing

References

External links
 The Golden Era of Grand Prix Racing 

Winners Grand Prix